Achim Hill (1 April 1935 – 4 August 2015) was a German rower who competed for the United Team of Germany in the 1960 Summer Olympics and in the 1964 Summer Olympics and for East Germany in the 1968 Summer Olympics. He was born in Köpenick. In 1960 he won the silver medal in the single sculls event. Four years later he won his second silver medal in the 1964 single sculls competition. At the 1968 Games he represented East Germany and finished fifth in the single sculls contest.

He competed at the inaugural 1962 World Rowing Championships. The Fédération Internationale des Sociétés d'Aviron (FISA) did not recognise East Germany, and so only one German crew was permitted per event. Selection trials between East and West German crews were held the day before the championships, with West German crews winning in six of the seven categories. Hill was the only East German who qualified (in the single sculls), but he did not proceed beyond the heats. Hill was out of form in the following year and did not even make it to the selection trials for the 1963 European Rowing Championships. He won the selection trial for the 1964 European Rowing Championships and came seventh at the regatta.

Hill studied airplane construction in West Berlin before the wall was raised, he then moved to Dresden, where he graduated as an engineer at the Institute of Rail Vehicles.

Hill married Gisela Jäger in 1973. He died on 4 August 2015.

References

External links

 Mention of Achim Hill's death 
 
 

1935 births
2015 deaths
Rowers from Berlin
East German male rowers
People from Treptow-Köpenick
Olympic rowers of the United Team of Germany
Olympic rowers of East Germany
Rowers at the 1960 Summer Olympics
Rowers at the 1964 Summer Olympics
Rowers at the 1968 Summer Olympics
Olympic silver medalists for the United Team of Germany
Olympic medalists in rowing
Medalists at the 1964 Summer Olympics
Medalists at the 1960 Summer Olympics
Recipients of the Patriotic Order of Merit in bronze
European Rowing Championships medalists